Stephen Lee, Steven Lee or Steve Lee may refer to:

Entertainment
 Stephen Lee (actor) (1955–2014), American actor
 Steve Lee (singer) (1963–2010), Swiss singer with Gotthard
 Steve Lee (hunter) (born 1967), Australian singer/songwriter and pro-gun activist
 Stephen Lee (TV presenter) (born 1972), English TV presenter
 Steven Lee (music producer) (born 1983), Korean-American music producer
 Steve Lee (songwriter), British songwriter 
 Steve Lee, singer and musician with Cathedral Quartet

Sports
 Steven Lee (born 1962), Australian alpine skier
 Stephen Lee (snooker player) (born 1974), English snooker player
 Stephen Lee (ice hockey) (born 1990), English ice hockey player
 Stephen Lee (speed skater) (born 1978), Australian ice speed skater

Other
 Stephen D. Lee (1833–1908), American Civil War general
 Stephen Lee (chemist) (born 1956), American chemistry professor at Cornell University
 Stephen Lee (bishop) (born 1956), Roman Catholic priest, bishop of Macau
 Stephen Lee (South African activist), South African apartheid era political activist, who escaped from the high-security Pretoria Central Prison with Tim Jenkin

See also 
 Stephen Leigh (born 1951), science fiction and fantasy writer